was the seventh son of Tokugawa Ieyasu with his concubine, Lady Chaa. He was born in Jurakudai, later he was granted Fukaya Domain by his father. After his death, he was succeeded by his sixth brother, Matsudaira Tadateru. His Buddhist name was Eisho-in (栄昌院).

References

1594 births
1599 deaths
Nagasawa-Matsudaira clan
Tokugawa clan